Shcherban (Cyrillic: Щерба́нь, Щерба́н) is a surname. In 2017, in Ukraine there were about 2,000 persons recorded with the surname variant Щерба́н and about 10,000 with variant  Щерба́нь.

The surname may refer to:

 Volodymyr Shcherban (born 1950), Ukrainian politician
 Yana Shcherban (born 1989), Russian volleyball player
 Yevhen Shcherban (1946–1996), Ukrainian businessman and politician

See also
 
Shcherba
Shcherbak (surname)
Shcherbakov (disambiguation)

References

Ukrainian-language surnames